Air Travel Organisers' Licensing (ATOL) is a United Kingdom Civil Aviation Authority (CAA) scheme to give financial protection to people who have purchased package holidays and flights from a member tour operator.

Corporate function 
The majority of UK tour operators are required to hold an ATOL licence, without which they may not legally sell air travel. ATOL-licensed firms will have had their business practices inspected by the CAA. An ATOL licensed tour operator must also obtain insurance bonds from the CAA. The aim of this is to provide refunds to travellers affected by any event which causes the airline to be unable to provide travel for its customers, and to arrange for flights (in addition to accommodation and other items which may be included in a package holiday) to return home those already abroad at the time.

History 
In the 1960s, voluntary organisations such as the Association of British Travel Agents (ABTA) provided a degree of financial protection for air travellers. In 1970, the Federation of Tour Operators (FTO) (then the Tour Operators Study Group) introduced a bonding scheme whereby their members had to obtain bonds to the value of 5% of their annual turnover. In 1972, ABTA followed suit.

Legal requirement 
The Civil Aviation Act 1971 established the CAA. Covered under this act was the creation of the original ATOL Regulations. These mandated that all tour operators whose primary mode of transport was by air (but not airlines themselves), must hold an ATOL licence. These regulations came into effect in 1973.

Early practice 
On 15 August 1974, the Court Line group collapsed. It was the second largest tour operator at the time and its subsidiaries included Clarksons Holidays, Horizon, and Medvillas. Clarksons Holidays held an ATOL licence and was therefore theoretically covered by its insurance bond. 

Although the 35,000 customers stranded abroad were successfully repatriated under the scheme, there were insufficient funds for the 100,000 people whose holidays had been paid for in advance. This was a blow to consumer confidence and led to considerable media attention. A government fund called the Air Travel Trust has since been introduced to pay for any excess which is not covered by ATOL.

Collapse of Thomas Cook 
On 23 September 2019 Thomas Cook went into compulsory liquidation, sparking the largest peacetime repatriation in the UK's history. With Thomas Cook being ATOL-protected, the Civil Aviation Authority set about repatriating more than 150,000 British holidaymakers.

References

External links 
 About ATOL - CAA

Aviation in the United Kingdom
Aviation authorities
Consumer protection law
1973 establishments in the United Kingdom
Consumer protection in the United Kingdom